Richard O'Callaghan (born Richard Brooke, 7 March 1940, London) is an English film, stage and television character actor.

He is the son of actors Patricia Hayes and Valentine Brooke, whose stage name was Valentine Rooke. As a boy actor he was known as Richard Brooke. He has led a versatile career in film, stage and television in a wide range of roles. He is best known for his role in the British film Carry On at Your Convenience (1971).

Personal life

He is married to the American actress Elizabeth Quinn.

He is Chairman of the Catholic Association of Performing Arts (UK) (CaAPA) (formerly the Catholic Stage Guild).

Film credits
 The Bofors Gun (1968) ... Rowe
 Carry On Loving (1970) ... Bertram Muffet
 Carry On at Your Convenience (1971) ... Lewis Boggs
 Butley (1974) ... Joey Keyston
 Galileo (1975) ... Fulganzio
 Watership Down (1978) (voice) ... Dandelion
 Dangerous Beauty (1998) ... Zealot

Television credits
 Out of the Unknown ('Stranger in the Family', episode) (1965)...Boy
 Z Cars (1965) ... Jim Blackitt 
 The Flower of Gloster (1967) ... Richard Doherty
 The Good and Faithful Servant (1967)
 The Ronnie Barker Playhouse (1968) ... Shelley Longfellow Morgan (1 episode) 'Tennyson' (1968)
 Public Eye ... Frank (2 episodes, 1968–1969) – "Mercury in an Off-White Mac" (1968), "Divide and Conquer" (1969)
 The Wednesday Play (1969) (1 episode: 'The Last Train through Harecastle Tunnel' (1969) ... Fowler
 Thirty-Minute Theatre (1970) (1 episode: 'The Tidewatchers'
 Vile Bodies (1970) ... Adam
 Thriller (1973) 1 episode: 'File It Under Fear' ... George Bailey
 Professional Foul (1977) ... Chetwyn
 Renoir, My Father (1978) ... Auguste Renoir
 Two's Company ... Richard (1 episode ("The Silence"), 1979)
 The Green Tie on the Little Yellow Dog (1983) (TV).
 Boon "The Fall and Rise of the Bowman" (1983) ... Cecil Bowman
 Spatz (1992) ... Horace Flint ( 1 episode, 1992)
 The History of Tom Jones, a Foundling (1997) TV series ... Mr Fitzpatrick
Midsomer Murders  (1 episode)  (2005) ... Trevor Machin ... "Bantling Boy" 
 Heartbeat 1 episode) (2005)... Ringer Redknapp ... "Rustlers & Hustlers" 
The Afternoon Play ... Harry ... 1 episode ... "Molly" (2006)
Dalziel and Pascoe ... Aiden Scarman ... 4 episodes ... "Demons on Our Shoulders" & "Project Aphrodite" (2007)
 Casualty ... Eddie Morris ... 1 episode ... "When Love Came to Town" (2008)
 New Tricks ... Will Carter ... 1 episode ... "Loyalties and Royalties" (2008)
 Red Dwarf: Back to Earth ... The Creator ... 1 episode ... "Part Three" (2009)
Red Dwarf X ... Hogey the Roguey ... 1 episode ... "The Beginning" (2012)

Theatre credits
 Dirty Linen (1976); Almost Free Theatre 
 Brimstone and Treacle (1979); Open Space Theatre
 Amadeus (1981); Her Majesty's Theatre, London
 The Happiest Days of Your Life (1984); Barbican Theatre, London
 The Magistrate (2000); Royal Exchange, Manchester
 Educating Rita (2002; UK tour)
 1605 (2005); Chichester Festival Theatre
 King Lear (2005); Chichester Festival Theatre
 Titus Andronicus (2006; as Marcus Andronicus); Shakespeare's Globe
 The Last Confession (2007); Chichester Festival Theatre/Theatre Royal, Haymarket
 Twelfth Night (2008; as Malvolio); Open Air Theatre, Regent's Park
 The Story of Vasco (2009; as Caesar); Orange Tree Theatre
 Haunting Julia (2011; as Joe Lukin); Riverside Studios, Hammersmith
 The Last Confession (2014; World tour)
 The Importance of Being Earnest (2015);(Vaudeville Theatre)

Radio credits
 Murder Must Advertise (1979, BBC Radio) ... Mr Willis
 The Lord of the Rings (1981, BBC Radio) ... Meriadoc Brandybuck
 Have His Carcase (1981, BBC Radio) ... Julian Perkins
 Patterson (1981, BBC Radio) ... Cuthbertson

Television roles

References

External links
 

1940 births
Living people
Male actors from London
English male child actors
English male film actors
English male stage actors
English male television actors
English male voice actors
English Roman Catholics